The 2017 Southern Conference women's soccer tournament was the postseason women's soccer tournament for the Southern Conference held from October 25 through November 5, 2017. The first round and quarterfinals of the tournament were held at campus sites, while the semifinals and final took place at Samford University Track & Soccer Stadium in Birmingham, Alabama. The ten-team single-elimination tournament consisted of four rounds based on seeding from regular season conference play. The Samford Bulldogs were the defending champions, but they were eliminated from the 2017 tournament with a 2–1 semifinal loss in double overtime to the UNC Greensboro Spartans. UNC Greensboro won the tournament with a 1–0 win over the Western Carolina Catamounts in the final. This was the seventh Southern Conference tournament title for the UNC Greensboro women's soccer program and the first for head coach Michael Coll.

Bracket

Schedule

First Round

Quarterfinals

Semifinals

Final

Statistics

Goalscorers 

3 Goals
 Cienna Rideout - UNC Greensboro
 Jermaine Seoposenwe - Samford

2 Goals
 Emily Threatt - Western Carolina

1 Goal
 Erin Bonner - Samford
 Karina Castillo - Mercer
 Logan Culver - Mercer
 Fiona Dodge - East Tennessee State
 Jordan Evans - Furman
 Ally Fordham - Mercer
 Eleonora Goldoni - East Tennessee State
 Isabel Hodgson - East Tennessee State
 Emily Jensen - UNC Greensboro
 Emily McKerlie - East Tennessee State
 Elena Pisanii - East Tennessee State
 Korrie Sauder - Samford
 Rachel Shah - Furman
 Grace Sommi - Samford
 Melanie Spensiero - UNC Greensboro
 Pauline Vienne - East Tennessee State
 Deyana Walker - Western Carolina

Notes

See also 
 2017 Southern Conference Men's Soccer Tournament

References

External links 

 
Southern Conference Women's Soccer Tournament